Daisy Mabel Hendley Gold (October 26, 1893 – April 7, 1975) was an American writer, poet, and journalist. She worked for the Statesville Record & Landmark and The Greenville Piedmont before becoming the managing editor of the Wilson Times in 1920. She later married John Daniel Gold, the editor and publisher of the Wilson Times. Gold authored a book of poetry, Tides of Life, in 1927 and a novel, It Was Forever, in 1940. She also wrote a history book titled A Town Named Wilson that was never published.

Early life and education 
Gold was born on October 26, 1893 in Iredell County, North Carolina. She was the daughter of Alvis Francis Hendley and his second wife, Celeste Rimmer Norris. She was of Scotch-Irish, French, and English descent. Gold attended local schools before studying at the North Carolina State Normal and Industrial College in Greensboro. She was enrolled at the Normal and Industrial College for three years, but did not graduate.

Career 
Gold began her journalism career working at the Statesville Record & Landmark and later worked for the Greenville Piedmont. She was invited to work as a foreign correspondent in Europe during World War I, but her parents dissuaded her from taking the post. In 1920 she became the managing editor of the Wilson Times. Gold worked at Wilson Times until 1947, writing feature stories about coastal and eastern North Carolina.

Gold authored a book of lyric poems called Tides of Life in 1927. In 1940 she published the book It Was Forever, a novel about a young married woman from coastal North Carolina who falls in love with a British sea captain. Prior to her death she was writing a history book on Wilson County titled A Town Named Wilson. The original typewritten manuscript of the unpublished history book is owned by the Wilson County Public Library. A Town Named Wilson has no mention of African-American citizens of the town except for a reference to slavery.

Personal life 
She married John Daniel Gold, editor and publisher of the Wilson Times and son of Pleasant Daniel Gold, on February 7, 1924. She was Gold's second wife, and became the stepmother of his three daughters. She and Gold had two children together, Celeste Gold and John Daniel Gold, Jr. Her husband was one of the wealthiest men in Wilson, and they lived in a Georgian Revival mansion on West Nash Street in Wilson. Her daughter married Robert Bain Broughton, the son of North Carolina Governor J. Melville Broughton and Alice Willson Broughton, and lived in the Broughton House in Raleigh.

Gold and her husband also owned a summer home in Morehead City, which they built in 1935. She was a member of the Presbyterian Church and was a registered Democrat. After her husband's death in 1954, Gold sold their house and built a Neo-Classical two-story home on West Nash Street.

She died on April 7, 1975 at a nursing home in Lillington. A prayer service was held by her family at the Mitchell Funeral Home in Raleigh. She was buried in Maplewood Cemetery in Wilson.

References 

1893 births
1975 deaths
20th-century American newspaper editors
20th-century American women writers
American people of English descent
American people of French descent
American people of Scotch-Irish descent
American Presbyterians
American women historians
American women journalists
American women novelists
American women poets
Christians from North Carolina
Editors of North Carolina newspapers
Daisy
North Carolina Democrats
People from Iredell County, North Carolina
University of North Carolina at Greensboro alumni
Women newspaper editors